Miss Universe Australia is a national beauty pageant that selects Australia's representative to the Miss Universe pageant. Miss Universe Australia is not only a beauty pageant but a self-development program that provides a platform for the country’s most inspirational, beautiful, talented, educated and confident young women to compete for the Miss Universe Australia title.

Organization
The Miss Universe name is a registered trade name owned by the Miss Universe Organization, owned since 1996 by Donald Trump and NBC. In 2015, after Trump made statements about illegal aliens from Mexico in his presidential campaign kickoff speech, NBC ended its business relationship with Trump and stated that they will no longer air the pageant, or the Miss USA pageant, on their networks.

Since 1992, Jim Davie, a distributor of swimwear and athletic wear, has also been managing the Miss Australia Awards. In 2002, Davie obtained the licence from the Miss Universe Organisation to select Miss Universe Australia to represent Australia at international Miss Universe pageants. The new national director of the Miss Universe Australia Organisation is Troy Barbagallo of Pink Tank Events. Pink Tank have managed the Miss Universe Western Australia pageant since 2009 and was rewarded for their best in world platform with the national job in February 2016. Barbagallo is also a director of Barbagallo Group, luxury motor vehicle group and The Horologist, a leading luxury watch dealer. Barbagallo founded Box Magazine in 2003.

A Miss Universe Australia pageant is held each year to select a young woman to represent Australia at the international Miss Universe pageant. Contestants to the national pageant come from each of the States and Territories of Australia, which are described as regions or divisions, and represent that State or Territory. In 2016 there are over 220 participants in the national pageant of which 30 are competing in the National Final.

History
The international Miss Universe pageants started in 1952. Until 2000, while the Miss Australia Awards were held, the winners of the Miss Australia pageant would normally represent Australia at international Miss Universe pageants, but Australia did not have a representative in each year's event.

In 1952 Leah MacCartney was the first Miss Universe Australia. She was Miss Victoria and later elected as Miss Universe Australia 1952 on 16 June 1952 in Melbourne.

In 1958 the independent pageant selected Miss Universe Australia. Miss Universe Australia partnered to Australian Photographic Agency (APA).

In 1964 and 1965 Miss Universe Australia selected by Agency casting in Melbourne.

Between 1968 and 1976 the winners of Quest of Quests Dream Girl Australia represented Australia at Miss Universe.

Between 1977 and 1990 the winners of Miss Australia Beauty or Miss Universe Australia by TVW Enterprises represented Australia at Miss Universe.

There was no Australian entrant to the Miss Universe pageant in 1991 and 2001.  In 2002 through 2004, the Australian representative to the Miss Universe pageant was chosen by a national pageant held in Sydney, organised by Adpro Management Group.

The national Miss Universe Australia pageant came under new management in 2005. Of the 307 who participated at the state level, 24 made it to the national pageant, and Michelle Guy became Miss Universe Australia 2005.

There have been two Miss Universe title holders representing Australia: Kerry Anne Wells in 1972 and Jennifer Hawkins in 2004. Welles entered the Miss Universe pageant as Miss Australia; Hawkins was chosen Miss Universe Australia and went on to win the Miss Universe title in Quito.

New owner 
In February 2016, was announced that the new director of Miss Universe Australia is Troy Barbagallo, appointed by IMG.

The Road to Miss Universe Australia
The Road to Miss Universe Australia is a television special that is broadcast on Channel 9 & 9Life. It is produced by Mathew Knight Media in partnership with Pink Tank Events.

International crowns 
 Two – Miss Universe winners: 
Kerry Anne Wells (1972)
Jennifer Hawkins (2004)

Gallery of winners

Titleholders
Color keys

State rankings

See also

 Miss Australia
 Miss World Australia
 Miss International Australia
 Miss Earth Australia

References

Sources

External links
 Official Miss Universe Australia website
 Miss Universe Australia 2012 Renae Ayris Appears on the cover of GCMAG in June 2012

 
Australia
Beauty pageants in Australia
Recurring events established in 2004
2004 establishments in Australia
Australian awards